Saint-Mamert-du-Gard is a commune in the Gard department, region of Occitania, southern France.

Population

See also
Communes of the Gard department

References

Communes of Gard